The economy of Mongolia has traditionally been based on agriculture and livestock. Mongolia also has extensive mineral deposits: copper, coal, molybdenum, tin, tungsten, and gold account for a large part of industrial production. Soviet assistance, at its height one-third of Gross domestic product (GDP), disappeared almost overnight in 1990–91, in the time of the collapse of the Soviet Union. Mongolia was driven into deep recession.

Economic growth picked up in 1997–99 after stalling in 1996 due to a series of natural disasters and increases in world prices of copper and cashmere. Public revenues and exports collapsed in 1998 and 1999 due to the repercussions of the Asian financial crisis. In August and September 1999, the economy suffered from a temporary Russian ban on exports of oil and oil products. Mongolia joined the World Trade Organization (WTO) in 1997. The international donor community pledged over $300 million per year in the last Consultative Group Meeting, held in Ulaanbaatar in June 1999.  Recently, the Mongolian economy has grown at a fast pace due to an increase in mining and Mongolia attained a GDP growth rate of 11.7% in 2013. However, because much of this growth is export-based, Mongolia is suffering from the global slowdown in mining caused by decreased growth in China.

Economic history

Socialist era

The rapid political changes of 1990–91 marked the beginning of Mongolia's efforts to develop a market economy, but these efforts have been complicated and disrupted by the dissolution and continuing deterioration of the economy of the former Soviet Union. Prior to 1991, 80% of Mongolia's trade was with the former Soviet Union, and 15% was with other Council for Mutual Economic Assistance (CMEA) countries. Mongolia was heavily dependent upon the former Soviet Union for fuel, medicine, and spare parts for its factories and power plants.

The former Soviet Union served as the primary market for Mongolian industry. In the 1980s, Mongolia's industrial sector became increasingly important. By 1989, it accounted for an estimated 34% of material products, compared to 18% from agriculture. However, minerals, animals, and animal-derived products still constitute a large proportion of the country's exports. Principal imports included machinery, petroleum, cloth, and building materials.

In the late 1980s, the government began to improve links with non-communist Asia and the West, and tourism in Mongolia developed. As of 1 January 1991, Mongolia and the former Soviet Union agreed to conduct bilateral trade in hard currency at world prices.

Despite its external trade difficulties, Mongolia has continued to press ahead with reform. Privatization of small shops and enterprises has largely been completed in the 1990s, and most prices have been freed. Privatization of large state enterprises has begun. Tax reforms also have begun, and the barter and official exchange rates were unified in late 1991.

Transition to a market economy
Between 1990 and 1993, Mongolia suffered triple-digit inflation, rising unemployment, shortages of basic goods, and food rationing. During that period, economic output contracted by one-third. As market reforms and private enterprise took hold, economic growth began again in 1994–95. Unfortunately, since this growth was fueled in part by over-allocation of bank credit, especially to the remaining state-owned enterprises, economic growth was accompanied by a severe weakening of the banking sector. GDP grew by about 6% in 1995, thanks to largely to a boom in copper prices. Average real economic growth leveled off to about 3.5% in 1996–99 due to the Asian financial crisis, the 1998 Russian financial crisis, and worsening commodity prices, especially copper and gold.

Mongolia's gross domestic product (GDP) growth fell from 3.2% in 1999 to 1.3% in 2000. The decline can be attributed to the loss of 2.4 million livestock in bad weather and natural disasters in 2000. Prospects for development outside the traditional reliance on nomadic, livestock-based agriculture are constrained by Mongolia's landlocked location and lack of basic infrastructure.  Since 1990, more than 1,500 foreign companies from 61 countries have invested a total of $338.3 million in Mongolia. By 2003 private companies made up 70% of Mongolian GDP and 80% of exports.

Until recently, there have been a very few restrictions on foreign investments during most of Mongolia's post-socialist period. Consequently, mining industry's contribution to FDI increased to almost 25% in 1999 from zero in 1990.

Economic development present day

Mongolia's reliance on trade with China meant that the worldwide financial crisis hit hard, severely stunting the growth of its economy. With the sharp decrease in metal prices, especially copper (down 65% from July 2008-February 2009), exports of its raw materials withered and by 2009 the stock market MSE Top-20 registered an all-time low since its dramatic spike in mid-2007. Just as the economy started to recover, Mongolia was hit by a Zud over the winter period of 2009–2010, causing many livestock to perish and thus severely affecting cashmere production which accounts for a further 7% of the country's export revenues.

According to the World Bank and International Monetary Fund estimates, real GDP growth reduced from 8% to 2.7% in 2009, and exports shrunk 26% from $2.5Bn to $1.9Bn before a promisingly steady increase up until 2008. Because of this, it was projected that between 20,000 and 40,000 fewer Mongolians (0.7% and 1.4% of the population respectively) will be lifted out of poverty, than would have been the case without the global financial crisis.

In late 2009 and the beginning of 2010, however, the market has begun to recover once again. Having identified and learnt from its previous economic instabilities, legislative reform and a tightened fiscal policy promises to guide the country onwards and upwards. In February 2010, foreign assets were recorded at USD1,569,449 million. New trade agreements are being formed and foreign investors are keeping a close eye on the "Asian Wolf".

Mining is the principal industrial activity in Mongolia, making up 30% of all Mongolian industry. Another important industry is the production of cashmere.  Mongolia is the world's second largest producer of cashmere, with the main company, Gobi Cashmere, accounting for 21% of world cashmere production as of 2006.

Total export in 2019 was US$7.6 billion.

The 2022 economic growth is expected to be one percent and international institutions anticipate the economy to speed up by at least six percent in 2023 from expanded commodity exports. A significant commodity export boom is expected starting from 2023 with new coal rail networks to China coming online and increased copper production from Rio Tinto’s underground mine Oyu Tolgoi in southern Mongolia.

The Wolf Economy
The term was coined by Ganhuyag Chuluun Hutagt and subsequently popularized by Renaissance Capital in their report "Mongolia: "Blue-sky opportunity". They state that Mongolia is set to become the new Asian tiger, or "Mongolian wolf" as they prefer to call it, and predict "unstoppable" economic growth. With the recent developments in the mining industry and foreign interest increasing at an astonishing rate, it is claimed that the 'Wolf Economy' looks ready to pounce. The term's aggressive title mirrors the country's attitude in the capital markets, and with newfound mineral prospects it has the chance to retain its title as one of the world's fastest growing economies.

Banks
The banking sector is highly concentrated, with five banks controlling about 80% of financial assets as of 2015: Shares of Mongolia’s five largest domestic banks are to be offered to the public for the first time on the soon-to-be partially privatized Mongolian Stock Exchange.

Commercial banks
KhasBank - KhasBank is a community development bank and microfinance institution headquartered in Ulaanbaatar, with a nationwide network of 100 offices and 1309 staff as of June 2012.
Khan Bank - Khan Bank has its central office in Ulaanbaatar, where 5 branches are located. It has 24 regional branch offices throughout the country, each of which supervises an additional 15 to 25 smaller branches in its area, totaling 512.
Golomt Bank - Golomt Bank started in 1995 and now manages around 23% of the assets in the domestic banking system.
Trade and Development Bank - TDB was formed in 1990 and is thus the oldest bank in Mongolia. It has a network of 28 branches and settlement centers, 60 ATMs, 1300 POS terminals, and Internet/SMS banking throughout the country. Foreign banks like ING are breaking into the market.

In terms of access to credit, Mongolia ranked 61st out of 189 economies in accordance with 2015 Ease of Doing Business survey. However, Mongolia had one of the highest banking branch penetration rates in the world at 1 bank branch per 15,257 residents as of May 2015.

Investment banks
With a strengthening capital market environment, many foreign and local investment institutions have begun to establish themselves in Mongolia. The most prominent local agencies include: TDB Capital , Eurasia Capital, Monet Investment Bank, BDSec, MICC , and Frontier Securities.

Environment

As a result of rapid urbanization and industrial growth policies under the communist regime, Mongolia's deteriorating environment has become a major concern. The burning of soft coal coupled with thousands of factories in Ulaanbaatar and a sharp increase in individual motorization has resulted in severe air pollution. Deforestation, overgrazed pastures, and, less recently, efforts to increase grain and hay production by plowing up more virgin land have increased soil erosion from wind and rain.

Other statistics
The following table shows the main economic indicators in 1990–2017.

Household income or consumption by percentage share:
 lowest 10%: 3.5%
 highest 10%: 35% (2005)

Distribution of family income - Gini index:
40 (2000)

Agriculture - products:
wheat, barley, vegetables, forage crops, sheep, goats, cattle, camels, horses

Industries:
construction and construction materials; mining (coal, copper, molybdenum, fluorspar, and gold); food and beverages; processing of animal products, cashmere wool and natural fiber manufacturing

Industrial production growth rate:
6% (2010 est.)

Electricity:
 production: 3.43 TWh (2006 est.)
 consumption: 2.94 TWh (2006 est.)
 exports: 15.95 GWh (2006 est.)
 imports: 125 GWh (2006 est.)

Electricity - production by source:
 fossil fuel: 80%
 hydro: 0%
 other: 20% (2011)
 nuclear: 0%

Oil:
 production:  (2006 est.)
 consumption:  (2006 est.)
 exports:  (2006 est.)
 imports:  (2006 est.)

Exports - commodities:
copper, apparel, livestock, animal products, cashmere wool, hides, fluorspar, other nonferrous metals

Imports - commodities:
machinery and equipment, fuel, cars, food products, industrial consumer goods, chemicals, building materials, sugar, tea

Exchange rates:
tögrögs/tugriks per US dollar: 1890 (2014), 1396 (2012), 1,420 (2009), 1,179.6 (2006), 1,205 (2005), 1,187.17 (2004), 1,171 (2003), 1,110.31 (2002), 1,097.7 (2001), 1,076.67 (2000)

See also
 Mongolia and the International Monetary Fund
 Agriculture in Mongolia
 Mining in Mongolia

References

External links 
  Official site of the Ministry of Finance
   Official government site of the Bank of Mongolia - the central bank 
 Mongolia CIA World Factbook

 
Economics in developing countries
Mongolia